Kaitag (self des. Хайдакьан кув ; oth. des. Kaidak, Karakaitak, Karkaidak, Qaidaqlan) is a Northeast Caucasian language spoken in Dagestan, Russia. It has sometimes been considered a divergent dialect of Dargwa due to it being part of the Dargin dialect continuum. The Routledge Ethnographic Handbook (2017) divided Kaitag into two dialects: northern (Magalis-Kaitak) and southern (Karakaitak). Recent results of the Association of the Russian Sociolinguists (2021) further developed it into three dialects: Lower Kaitag, Upper Kaitag and Shari.

Dialects 
The languages consists of eight varieties, forming three dialects. Each of the Upper varieties corresponds to a historical province of the region.
 Upper Kaitag – Хъар Хайдакь (south-west).
 Shurkkant – "The Cliff Dwellers" – Шурккант.
Qattagan – "The Gorge Dwellers" – Къаттагне.
Irchamul – "The Land of Nine" – Ирчӏамул.
Lower Kaitag – Ххьар Хайдакь.
Barshamai – Баршамаӏъган.
Karatsan – Гъаӏрцӏнила.
Jibahni – Чӏивгьаӏн.
Sanchi – Сунклан.
Shari – Шаӏръи.

Phonology

Vowels

Consonants 
Consonants form by series of voiced, aspirated, fortis, ejective, and labialized variants. The palatal fricative [ç] might be the voiceless post-palatal fricative, which can be more precisely transcribed as [ç̠] or [x̟].

Alphabet 
The Kaitag language is usually written in the Cyrillic script. The letters of the alphabet are (with their pronunciation given below in IPA transcription):

Lexicon 
Most of Kaitag's vocabulary stems from proto-Northeast-Caucasian roots. Like with other languages of Dagestan, there is a considerable number of Arabic, Iranian, Turkic and recently Russian loanwords.

References 

Northeast Caucasian languages